"" is the national anthem of Tonga. The title literally means "song of the king of the Tonga Islands" in the Tongan language but is in daily life better known as "", which translates to "National Song". The lyrics of the anthem were written by Tongan Prince Uelingatoni Ngū Tupoumalohi, with the music by German-born New Zealand composer Karl Gustavus Schmitt. It was first used in 1874.

Lyrics

Music notation

Notes

References

External links

YouTube - Ko E Fasi 'O E Tu'i 'O E 'Otu Tonga (The Tune of the King of the Tongan Isles)

Oceanian anthems
National symbols of Tonga
Tongan music
National anthems
National anthem compositions in F major
Tongan-language songs